Highway 60 also known as Tafilah Highway is an East-West Highway in Jordan. It starts from Highway 15 and ends at Highway 65. The highway is the main access route to the city of Tafilah.

See also
Itinerary of the highway on Google Maps

Roads in Jordan